The 2022–23 Minnesota Wild season is the 23rd season for the National Hockey League franchise that was established on June 25, 1997.

Standings

Divisional standings

Conference standings

Schedule and results

Regular season

Player statistics
As of March 11, 2023

Skaters

Goaltenders

†Denotes player spent time with another team before joining the Wild. Stats reflect time with the Wild only.
‡Denotes player was traded mid-season. Stats reflect time with the Wild only.
Bold/italics denotes franchise record.

Roster

Transactions
The Wild have been involved in the following transactions during the 2022–23 season.

Key:

 Contract is entry-level.
 Contract initially takes effect in the 2023–24 season.

Trades

Players acquired

Players lost

Signings

Draft picks

Below are the Minnesota Wild's selections at the 2022 NHL Entry Draft, which was held on July 7 to 8, 2022, at Bell Centre in Montreal.

References

Minnesota Wild seasons
Wild
2022 in sports in Minnesota
2023 in sports in Minnesota